Falcarindiol is a polyyne found in carrot roots which has antifungal activity. Falcarindiol is the main compound responsible for bitterness in carrots. Falcarindiol and other falcarindiol-type polyacetylenes are also found in many other plants of the family Apiaceae, including some commonly used seasonings such as dill and parsley. A variety of bioactivities have been reported so far for falcaridiol and the falcarindiol-type polyacetylenes, and because of potential health-promoting metabolic effects these compounds are studied as potential nutraceuticals. It is the most-active among several polyynes with potential anticancer activity found in Devil's Club (Oplopanax horridus), a medicinal plant used by many indigenous peoples in Alaska and the Pacific Northwest.

See also 
 Falcarinol

References 

Fungicides
Diols
Conjugated diynes
Secondary alcohols